Mustappa Sirat (born 4 October 1957) is a diplomat and politician in the Government of Brunei. He took office as the Minister of Communications from 2015 to 2018 and also as the Deputy Minister of Defence.

Early life 
Mustappa Sirat is born in Seria, Belait, Brunei on 4 October 1957. His career began as an English teacher in Berakas English School prior to working with the government.

Political career 
In November 1982, Mustappa started working in the Ministry of Foreign Affairs as the director general in the Association of Southeast Asian Nations (ASEAN)–Brunei division and later the Policy Planning Department. In 1985, he became Brunei's second secretary to the United Kingdom, and later posted to Paris, France and Geneva, Switzerland. Moreover, he was the high commissioner to Pakistan from 18 March 2003 to 4 November 2004. Once returning to Brunei, Mustappa was reappointed as the Deputy Permanent Secretary, and Permanent Secretary in the Ministry of Defence (MINDEF) in June 2005. Posted to the Prime Minister's Office (PMO) as their Permanent Secretary on 12 October 2007.

From 26 to 28 September 2010, Minister Mustappa visited Singapore and discussed with Teo Chee Hean, ways to strengthen relationships between Brunei and Singapore. He met with Ashton B. Carter to discuss future collaborations between the two nations in Washington, United States on 27 June 2013. On 22 October 2015, an announcement was made by the Minister of Defence and Sultan of Brunei, Hassanal Bolkiah, about the new cabinet members of the 2015 reshuffle, Dato Mustappa became the new minister in the Ministry of Communications. China Ambassador to Brunei, Madame Yang Jian, visited Minister Mustappa and congratulated him on his newly appointed position, followed by discussions focusing on improving transportation and communication between the two nations on 18 November. After the 2018 cabinet reshuffle on 30 January 2018, Abdul Mutalib would succeed Dato Mustappa in his position as the minister.

Personal life 
Dato Mustappa is married to Hajah Jamilah binti Pengiran Haji Mohd Yussof and has one son together. He participated in the Fadhil Yunus & Adib Noor The BMW Golf Cup Brunei 2021 on 17 September 2022.

Honours 

 Order of Setia Negara Brunei First Class (PSNB) – Dato Seri Setia
 Order of Seri Paduka Mahkota Brunei Second Class (DPMB) – Dato Paduka
 Meritorious Service Medal (PJK)
 Service to State Medal (PIKB)

External links 

 CHIEFS OF DEFENSE (CHOD) ANNUAL CONFERENCE 2014 – 4 NOVEMBER 2014

References 

1957 births
Government ministries of Brunei
Members of the Legislative Council of Brunei
Living people